C55-isoprenyl pyrophosphate (undecaprenyl pyrophosphate; C55-PP) is an essential molecule involved in construction of the bacterial peptidoglycan cell wall. It is a receptor found in the plasma membrane of bacteria that allows glycan tetrapeptide monomers synthesized in the cell cytoplasm to translocate to the periplasmic space.

A related compound is C55-P (undecaprenyl phosphate), differing by having one fewer phosphate group. It is produced from C55-PP by reaction EC 3.6.1.27, typically catalyzed by UppP/BacA. C55-P is recycled back into C55-PP later in the process. C55-OH is known as bactoprenol.

References

Organophosphates
Terpenes and terpenoids